KH. Muhammad Dahlan (born on June 2, 1909 - died on February 1, 1977, at the age of 67 years) 14 Jumada al-Ula coincide with 1327 Hijri, in the village of Mandaran, Rejo, Pasuruan, East Java. Muhammad Dahlan was the third son of five children. His Father was named Dahlan Abdul Hamid and his mother was Chamsiyah. Dahlan's village is located on the coast, approximately three kilometers from the town of Pasuruan. Together with his eldest brother, he diligently followed the study groups as previous scholars who follow the teachings around the courtyard of Masjid Al-Harram Mecca. In the holy city he studied various religious sciences, and got to know the outside world in general that would be a provision in building his country, especially when doing business with the Nahdlatul Ulama. Dahlan appearance in the arena movement began in 1930. He is the figure who pioneered the establishment of NU Bangil branch, and also become its chairman. Five years later he was elected chairman of the NU branch of Pasuruan.

In the areas of government, he was given the mandate to the Cabinet as Minister of Religious Development in the First Development Cabinet (1967-1971), which he also pioneered interfaith discussion on 30 November 1967, that the events do not happen against interfaith intolerance. KH. M. Dahlan, who led the meeting put forward the points plan approval, which is essentially religious propaganda that is not done with the aim of increasing the number of followers of each religion, but carried out to deepen the understanding and practice of their respective religions.

One of the great merits for the nation is with Prof. KH. Ibrahim Hosen initiating the Musabaqah Tilawatil Qur'an (MTQ) national level for the first time held in Ujung Pandang. In addition, with KH. Zaini Miftah, KH. Ali Masyhar and Prof. DR. HA Mukti Ali on January 23, 1970, form Ulumuddin Ihya Foundation, pioneered the establishment of the College of the Quran (PTIQ), a college that specializes in teaching the art of reading and memorizing the Quran.

In the field of science, Dahlan were prominent in fiqh disciplines supported by a collection of books that he had. Dahlan it causes very moderate in view of divergence among the Shafi'i imam. He appears to be rigid with certain schools of opinion in determining whether a law, so far as the opinion was judged quite argumentative.

Kiai Dahlan's decision to leave Pasuruan to move to Jakarta was influenced by reading the Dalail Khairat after Fajr until the Duha prayer before or after Maghrib until Isha prayers. On February 1, 1997, finished reading the book like the usual days, KH. Rahmatullah Mohammad Dahlan died. His body was buried in the Heroes Cemetery Kalibata, as a form of government recognition of his services to build Indonesia.

1909 births
1977 deaths
Government ministers of Indonesia
People from Pasuruan
Javanese people
Politicians from East Java